Khamanon is a town and a Nagar Panchayat in Fatehgarh Sahib district in the Indian state of Punjab.

Geography
It has an average elevation of 254 metres (833 feet).

Demographics
 India census, Khamanon had a population of 10135. Males constitute 53% of the population and females 47%.

See also
Mohan Majra

References

Cities and towns in Fatehgarh Sahib district